The Seychelles house snake (Boaedon geometricus) is a species of snake in the family Colubridae.
It is endemic to Seychelles.

Its natural habitats are subtropical or tropical dry forest, subtropical or tropical moist lowland forest, and rural gardens.
It is threatened by habitat loss.

References

Fauna of Seychelles
Lamprophiidae
Reptiles described in 1837
Endemic fauna of Seychelles
Taxonomy articles created by Polbot